Karl Stein (1 January 1913 in Hamm, Westphalia  – 19 October 2000) was a German mathematician. He is well known for complex analysis and cryptography. Stein manifolds and Stein factorization are named after him.

Career 
Karl Stein received his doctorate with his dissertation on the topic Zur Theorie der Funktionen mehrerer komplexer Veränderlichen; Die Regularitätshüllen niederdimensionaler Mannigfaltigkeiten at the University of Münster under the supervision of Heinrich Behnke in 1937. Karl Stein was conscripted into the Wehrmacht sometime before 1942, and trained as a cryptographer to work at OKW/Chi, the Cipher Department of the High Command of the Wehrmacht. He was assigned to manage the OKW/Chi IV, Subsection a, which was a unit responsible for security of own processes, cipher devices testing, and invention of new cipher devices. He managed a staff of 11 In 1955 he became professor at the Ludwig Maximilian University of Munich and emeritated in 1981. In 1990 he received the first Cantor medal.

Students
Stein's doctoral students included ,  Otto Forster, Gunther Schmidt and Martin Schottenloher.

References

 

1913 births
2000 deaths
People from Hamm
20th-century German mathematicians
University of Münster alumni
Academic staff of the Ludwig Maximilian University of Munich
German cryptographers